Rock Angelz is a soundtrack album to the 2005 direct-to-video film of the same name, based on the doll toyline, Bratz. It was released on July 26, 2005, by Hip-O Records. The album had multiple promotional singles released.

Singles
"So Good" was released as the first single from the album on August 22, 2005, in Australia. It was released in Germany on September 5.

Track listing

B-sides

Personnel 
This information is from Genius.

Andy Malm – producer, composer, engineer
Deborah Siegel – producer
Doug Shawe – producer, engineer, mixing engineer
Fredrik Hult – producer, bassist, bass guitarist, engineer, guitarist, mixing engineer
Ola Larsson – producer, engineer, keyboardist, mixing engineer
Ray Roc – producer, remixing engineer
Joacim Persson – producer, audio producer, engineer, guitarist, mixing engineer
Ali Thomson – songwriter
Andreas Carlsson – songwriter
Bridget Benenate – songwriter, composer
Jim Dyke – songwriter, composer
Jörgen Elofsson – songwriter
Marc Nelkin – songwriter, composer
Matthew Gerrard – songwriter, composer
Mikael Albertsson – songwriter
Niclas Molinder – songwriter, producer, audio producer, engineer, mixing engineer
Niklas Pettersson – songwriter
Steve Booker – songwriter
Vincent DeGiorgio – songwriter
Dana Smart – a&r
Geo Bokestad – a&r, executive producer
Peter Swartling – a&r, executive producer
Mats Norrefalk – acoustic guitarist
Niko Valsamidis – acoustic guitarist, guitarist
Vartan – art director
Horse (band) – audio producer, engineer, mixing engineer
Anna Nordell – main vocalist, background vocalist
Janet Leon – main vocalist, background vocalist
Kerima Holm – background vocalist
Linda Lindéh – background vocalist
Maryanne Morgan – songwriter, background vocalist
Pelle Ankarberg – background vocalist
Fredrik Landh – bassist, bass guitarist
Danne Carlsson – bass guitarist
Andrew Lane – composer
A.P. Thompson – composer
Johan Lindskoog – drum programmer
Boba “Fat” Dylan – drummer
Bruce Resnikoff – executive producer
Isaac Larian – executive producer
Pat Lawrence – executive producer
Clas Olfsson – guitarist
Gavin Lurssen – mastering engineer
Monique McGuffin – production coordinator
Per Eklund – songwriter
Tony Malm – songwriter
TWIN – producer, audio producer, engineer, mixing engineer
Lisa Rachelle Greene – songwriter
D. Steven Thomas – songwriter
Markus Sepehrmanesh – songwriter
Mats Jansson – songwriter
Robert Habolin – songwriter
Cheryl Parker – songwriter
Sara Eker – songwriter
Robbie Nevil – songwriter
Mitch Hunt – songwriter

Charts

Release history

References 

Bratz albums
2005 soundtrack albums